Informer is a Serbian tabloid newspaper based in Belgrade. It is known for its political bias in favor of the ruling Serbian Progressive Party (SNS) and its sensationalist stories. The newspaper has been accused of spreading disinformation and sensationalism.

As of 2016, it claims without documentation to be the highest-circulation daily in Serbia, alleging over 100,000 copies distributed daily. The newspaper addresses politics, regional and world news, popular culture, health, and sports.

It practices yellow journalism. It is notorious for publishing false information, as well as for insulting and discrediting President Aleksandar Vučić's political opponents. It publishes articles with chauvinist and sexist biases.

Controversies
In 2015, Informer manufactured an international scandal by publishing screenshots of a porn video starring American pornographic actress Diamond Foxxx, with accompanying text that falsely alleged the stills were from a sex tape featuring the President of Croatia, Kolinda Grabar-Kitarović. This was "sharply condemned" by Serbia's Ministry of Culture and Information, which called for sanctions, as well as by MP Azra Jasavić of neighbouring Montenegro, where the newspaper is also published. Jasavić called for changes in law to prevent Informer from its "brutalisation of women", whom Jasavić said are targeted by the tabloid.

In 2019, EU vs Disinformation reported that Informer was one of the foremost Serbian sources of false narratives and warmongering in 2018. According to Serbian investigative journalism portal Crime and Corruption Reporting Network, more than 700 fake news items were published on the front pages of pro-government tabloids during 2018, led by Informer. Many decried invented attacks on Aleksandar Vučić or attempted coups, as well as supposed messages of support from Russian president Vladimir Putin. In 2020, Twitter shut down a network of 8,500 bots that spammed 43 million tweets; the bots fawned over President Vučić and his party, boosted pro-Vučić content, and attacked his political opponents; Informer links were among the most frequently spammed. On 22 February 2022, two days before the Russian invasion of Ukraine, Informer published a large headline saying that "Ukraine has attacked Russia".

In late September 2022, Informer published an interview with a serial rapist Igor Milošević, who had just been released after having served 15 years in prison. Milošević sent messages to women of Serbia which were widely seen as controversial and that led to citizens' protests, during which Informers editor-in-chief Dragan J. Vučićević was physically attacked.

See also

 Serbian Progressive Party
 Propaganda through media
 List of newspapers in Serbia

Notes

External links
 

Newspapers published in Serbia
Newspapers established in 2012
2012 establishments in Serbia
Mass media in Belgrade